Hutup is a small village in Ormanjhi tehsil,  Ranchi district, Jharkhand,  India. It is one of 91 villages in Ormanjhi Block along with villages like Koilari and Karma.  The village is mostly known for its famous zamindar or king 'Thakur Tilak Dhari Singh . zamindar of seven nearby villages.He was very much praised by the villagers. He played a very great role. And donated most of the land to poor farmers . He donated many lands for temples,mosques,Schools and Hospital. he ruled the village with honour and pride. At present His grandsons(Thakur Dhruvpratap singh,Thakur Govind Singh,Thakur Aditya Singh And Thakur Sarju Singh) are also contributing and raising the name of The Great Tilakdhari Singh. Its nearest railway station is in Ranchi, accessible via National Highway 33.

Education 

In Hutup there are private and public schools. In private schools the family needs to pay the fees. Poor families can send their children to government schools without paying any fees.
Aangan Wadi – 1- to 5-year-olds go to Aangan Wadi. They get rice, soybean and dal and are given a basic education.
A.G. Church School
Yuwa School – By Yuwa-India

Amrita College of Nursing is a private college at Hutup, PO Irba.

Hospitals  

Medanta Hospital – Previously called Apollo Hospital, this is a private hospital and the most well-known hospital in Hutup. It is located on NH33 Road. Many patients come there for treatment, especially soldiers after receiving gunshot wounds. Yuwa girls have insurance cards so that they can get treatment at half price.
Shalini Hospital – This hospital is used for emergencies by villagers, including pregnant women. It is located on Rukka Road. This hospital offers free treatment to those with health cards.

Religion 
Devi Temple is one of the oldest temples. It was built by the villagers. The Christian villagers worship at Jesu Bhavan, which is next to Yuwa School. The Muslims have a masjid to worship at, near Karma village.

Sports 
Football is the most popular sport in Hutup. In Hutup there is a large girls' football field which is known as Yuwa-India.  Yuwa is only for girls who live in the village.

References

External links

 Yuwa-India girl students create wiki page for Hutup
 Photos of Hutup taken by students from Yuwa-India

Villages in Ranchi district